Harpalus jordanus is a species of ground beetle in the subfamily Harpalinae. It was described by Jedlicka in 1964.

References

jordanus
Beetles described in 1964